The Medal "For Construction of the Baikal-Amur Railway" was a civilian award of the Soviet Union established on October 8, 1976 by Decree of the Presidium of the Supreme Soviet of the USSR to recognise active participation in the construction of the Baikal-Amur Railway, a huge multi year project under the leadership of then Soviet general secretary Leonid Brezhnev.  The medal's statute was amended on July 18, 1980 by decree of the Presidium of the Supreme Soviet of the USSR № 2523-X.

Medal statute
The Medal "For Construction of the Baikal-Amur Railway" was awarded to active participants in the construction of the Baikal-Amur Railway, on the rail section Bam – Tynda – Berkakit, on the second rail section Taishet – Lena, in the production facilities, in the building of housing for the  civilian workers, for good work in construction, for high-quality designs and survey work, for honest work at enterprises, institutions and organizations directly supporting the construction efforts and the workers.  The medal was usually awarded to workers, engineering-technical workers and employees who worked on the project in its construction, design or for its maintenance for at least three years.

Recommendations for award of the Medal "For construction of the Baikal-Amur Railway" were made by the Party administration, trade union and Komsomol organizations, enterprises, institutions and organizations, and sent to the Ministry of Transport Construction of the USSR for review.  The names of the recipients was then forwarded to the executive committees of the Amur Oblast, Irkutsk Oblast, Chita Oblast, Khabarovsk Regional Council of People's Deputies and to the Supreme Soviet Presidium of the Buryat and Yakut Autonomous Soviet Socialist Republics, which, after final consideration, awarded the medal on behalf of the Presidium of the Supreme Soviet of the RSFSR in the communities of the recipients.

The Medal "For construction of the Baikal-Amur Railway" was worn on the left side of the chest and in the presence of other medals of the USSR, immediately after the Medal "For the Development of Virgin Lands".  If worn in the presence of awards of the Russian Federation, the latter have precedence.

Each medal came with an attestation of award, this attestation came in the form of a small 8 cm by 11 cm cardboard booklet bearing the award's name, the recipient's particulars and an official stamp and signature on the inside.  Following the death of the recipient, the medal and attestation of award certificate remained with the family as a memento.

Medal description
The Medal "For Construction of the Baikal-Amur Railway" was a 32 mm in diameter brass circular medal with a raised rim.  On its obverse, in the background in the left half of the medal, the relief image of hills and a train going left across a bridge over a river, under the bridge, the relief inscription on five lines "For the construction of the Baikal-Amur Railway", in the right half of the medal, the left profiles of a man and a woman, the man wearing a construction helmet, the woman being closer and slightly to the right.  On the reverse, the Sun over railroad tracks intersected by a ribbon bearing the inscription "BAM" framed by a laurel wreath with the hammer and sickle at the top.

The medal was secured to a standard Soviet pentagonal mount by a ring through the medal suspension loop. The mount was covered by a 24 mm wide overlapping silk moiré ribbon with 1 mm wide light green edge stripes, three 3 mm wide central yellow stripes separated by two 0,5 mm grey stripes, bordered by two 6 mm wide dark green stripes.

Recipients (partial list)
The individuals below were recipients of the Medal "For Construction of the Baikal-Amur Railway".

Mikhail Yefimovich Nikolayev
Alexey Vasiliyevich Gordeyev
Valentin Vitalyevich Lebedev
Abdul-Vahed Niyazov
Dmitry Fyodorovich Mezentsev
Rimma Fyodorovna Kazakova
Vyacheslav Stepanovich Ikonnikov
Vladimir Nikolaevich Suprun
Salman Magomedrasulovich Babaev
Nikolai Alekseevich Sorokin
Victor Efimovich Biryukov
Vladimir Yemelianovich Gritsishin
Vladislav Vladimirovich Nikolaev
Ivan Konstantinovich Sahinidi
Vyacheslav Grigor'evich Kubarev
Kim Ivanovich Bazarsadaev, 
Fedor Petrovich Krendelev

See also
Baikal-Amur Mainline
Orders, decorations, and medals of the Soviet Union

References

External links
 Legal Library of the USSR
 The Russian Gazette

Civil awards and decorations of the Soviet Union
Awards established in 1976
Awards disestablished in 1991
Rail transport industry awards
Rail transport in the Soviet Union
1976 establishments in the Soviet Union
1991 disestablishments in the Soviet Union